"Cheer Up, Mother" is a World War I era song released in 1918. Mary Earl composed the music and wrote the lyrics. Shapiro, Bernstein & Co. of New York, New York published the song. Artist Albert Wilfred Barbelle designed the sheet music cover. It features a mother saying good-bye to her soldier son. It was written for both voice and piano.

In the song, a son is comforting his mother before he heads off to war. The chorus is as follows: 
"Cheer up, mother, smile and don't be sighing
Dry the teardrop in your eye;
We'll come back with colors flying
After the war clouds roll by, 
Homeward bound then
We'll come sailing, mother.
We will win out, never fear;
Dad came home from fields of glory,
Maybe I'll repeat his story,
So cheer up, mother dear."

The sheet music can be found at Pritzker Military Museum & Library.

References

Songs about mothers
Songs about parting
Songs about soldiers
1918 songs
Songs of World War I
Songs written by Robert A. King (composer)